Richard Dostálek  (born 26 April 1974) is a Czech professional football coach and a former player who played as a midfielder. He is the manager of Zbrojovka Brno. He spent most of his Gambrinus liga career at 1. FC Brno. In 1994, he won the Talent of the Year award at the Czech Footballer of the Year awards.

Personal life
Dostalek is married and had two children.

Honours

Managerial 
FC Zbrojovka Brno
 Czech National Football League: 2021–22

References

External links
 Richard Dostálek at FC Zbrojovka Brno official website 
 
 
 
 

1974 births
Living people
People from Uherské Hradiště
Sportspeople from the Zlín Region
Czech footballers
Association football midfielders
Czech Republic international footballers
Czech Republic under-21 international footballers
Czech First League players
2. Bundesliga players
Russian Premier League players
FC Zbrojovka Brno players
1. FC Slovácko players
FC Fastav Zlín players
SK Slavia Prague players
FC Rubin Kazan players
FC Erzgebirge Aue players
Sportfreunde Siegen players
SK Líšeň players
Czech football managers
FC Zbrojovka Brno managers
Czech expatriate footballers
Czech expatriate sportspeople in Germany
Expatriate footballers in Germany
Czech expatriate sportspeople in Russia
Expatriate footballers in Russia